The English Montreal School Board (EMSB) is one of five public school boards on the island of Montreal.

At 92.4 percent, the English Montreal School Board has the highest rate of students who earn a high school diploma among all public school boards in Quebec. This success rate is considerably higher than the provincewide average of 81.8 percent, and is only slightly lower than the 92.9 percent success rate for private schools.

The EMSB is one of two English-language school boards on the island of Montreal. Its territory consists of 14 of the 19 boroughs of the city of Montreal (Saint-Laurent, Ahuntsic-Cartierville, Montréal-Nord, Anjou, Saint-Léonard, Villeray–Saint-Michel–Parc-Extension, Outremont, Côte-des-Neiges–Notre-Dame-de-Grâce, Sud-Ouest, Ville-Marie, Plateau Mont-Royal, Rosemont–La Petite-Patrie, Mercier–Hochelaga-Maisonneuve and Rivière-des-Prairies–Pointe-aux-Trembles) as well as the municipalities of Côte-Saint-Luc, Hampstead, Mont-Royal, Montréal-Est, Montréal-Ouest and Westmount. English-language public education in the western portion of Montreal Island is administered by the Lester B. Pearson School Board.

The Director General of the EMSB is Nick Katalifos, who is the school board's chief administrative officer.

Structurally, the EMSB has two Assistant Director Generals:  Jack H. Chadirdjian and Pela Nickoletopoulos. The school board also has three regional directors, who have independent responsibility for oversight of the elementary schools (Demetrios Giannacopoulos), high schools (Nathalie Lacroix-Maillette) and adult education and vocational centres (Angela Spagnolo). The school board also has a secretary-general (Me Nathalie Lauzière), who has a key role in the board's functioning. 
 The Administration Building of the EMSB is located at 6000 Fielding Avenue in  Notre-Dame-de-Grâce. The building was formerly occupied by the Protestant School Board of Greater Montreal (PSBGM).

History
The Government of Quebec reorganized the province's public school boards in the mid-1990s. School boards in Quebec had been organized along religious confessional lines, Catholic and Protestant, since before Canadian Confederation. The province of Quebec was guaranteed a confessional public school system by the British North America Act, 1867, now known as the Constitution Act, 1867. The provincial government was required to ask the federal government to amend the Canadian Constitution if it were to reorganize school boards along linguistic lines (English and French). The amendment was passed by both the House of Commons and the Senate, notwithstanding the unresolved constitutional debate between Quebec and the rest of Canada.

The EMSB officially began operations on July 1, 1998, after the English sectors of the Protestant School Board of Greater Montreal (PSBGM), the Montreal Catholic School Commission (CECM), the Commission scolaire Jérôme-Le Royer and the Commission scolaire Sainte-Croix were amalgamated to form the EMSB.

The political infighting among the board's commissioners has received significant coverage in Montreal's English-language media, most notably the Montreal Gazette. This competition, for the most part, had previously pitted Catholics vs. Protestants. That division has recently become much less significant, however. But the harmonization of the previous boards' administrative policies and the debate over school closings due to declining enrollment have been especially inflammatory. In 2005, both the Montreal Gazette and the French-language tabloid Le Journal de Montréal printed a special series of articles denouncing alleged nepotism and graft in the province's public school boards. The Gazette's investigation focused almost exclusively on the hiring practices of the English Montreal School Board.

Enrollment in the English Montreal School Board's schools and centres continues to decline as it does in most English-language public school boards in Quebec. This is a part of an ongoing decline following the enactment of the Charter of the French Language by the Québec government In 1977.

Since the EMSB's creation in 1998, the board has closed 21 schools, most recently 2 elementary schools and 1 high school in 2020. The School Board's chairperson attributes the declining enrolment to Bill 101, families moving to cities with lower home taxes, such as Laval; and the general decline in birth rates.

The EMSB had the highest voter turnout among all school boards in Quebec, with 18%.

In 2019, the EMSB said it would not enforce Bill 21, the Government of Quebec's proposed ban of public servants wearing religious symbols, stating that the board has never received a complaint from a parent or student about a teacher's religious symbol.

Political stands
The EMSB deployed efforts to persuade federal government to challenge the legality of Quebec CAQ government's 2021 Bill 96 for a ruling to the Supreme Court.

Chairs of the English Montreal School Board
George Vathilakis 1997–1998 (Provisional Council)
George Vathilakis 1998–2001
John Simms 2001–2003
Dominic Spiridigliozzi 2003–2007
Angela Mancini 2007–2020
Joe Ortona 2020-

Vice-Chairs of the English Montreal School Board
Dominic Spiridigliozzi 1997–1998 (Provisional Council)
Dominic Spiridigliozzi 1998–2003
Elizabeth Fokoefs 2003–2007
Sylvia Lo Bianco 2007–2014
Sylvia Lo Bianco 2014–2018
Joe Ortona 2018–2020
Agostino Cannavino 2020-

List of EMSB Schools
This school board oversees 33 elementary schools, 16 secondary schools, 8 outreach schools, 7 social affairs institutions and 12 adult and vocational centres, in which over 44,000 students are enrolled.

Elementary schools

 Bancroft School 
 Carlyle School
 Cedarcrest School 
 Coronation School 
 Dalkeith School 
 Dante School
 Dunrae Gardens School
 East Hill School
 Edinburgh School 
 Edward Murphy School
 Elizabeth Ballantyne School
 Gardenview School
 Gerald McShane School
 Hampstead School 
 Honoré-Mercier School
 John Caboto Academy 
 Leonardo da Vinci Academy
 Merton School
 Michelangelo International Elementary School
 Nesbitt School
 Our Lady of Pompei School
 Parkdale School
 Pierre de Coubertin School 
 Pierre Elliott Trudeau School
 Roslyn School
 Sinclair Laird School
 St. Gabriel School
 St. Monica School
 Westmount Park School
 Willingdon School

Elementary/Secondary Schools

 F.A.C.E. School
 Royal Vale School 
 St. Raphael School

Secondary Schools

 James Lyng High School
 John F. Kennedy High School
 John Grant High School
 LaurenHill Academy
 Laurier Macdonald High School 
 Lester B. Pearson High School.
 L.I.N.K.S. High School
 Marymount Academy International 
 M.I.N.D. High School
 Rosemount High School 
 Royal West Academy
 Vincent Massey Collegiate 
 Westmount High School 
 Focus High School
 Options High School
 Outreach High School
 Perspectives I High School
 Perspectives II High School
 Programme Mile-End High School
 Venture High School
 Vezina High School

Social Affairs Schools

 Cité des Prairies
 Elizabeth High School
 Mackay Centre School
 Montreal Children's Hospital
 Mountainview School Project Centre
 Philip E. Layton School
 Sir Mortimer B. Davis School

Adult and Vocational Education Centres

 Galileo Adult Education Centre
 The HSM Adult Education Centre
 James Lyng Adult Education Centre
 John F. Kennedy Adult Education Centre
 Wagar Adult Education Centre
 St. Laurent Adult Education Centre
 Laurier Macdonald Vocational Centre
 Des Grandes-Prairies
 Rosemount Technology Centre
 Shadd Health and Business Centre
 St. Pius X Career Centre

References

External links
EMSB website (French – English)

 
Education in Montreal
School districts in Quebec
Quebec English School Boards Association